Richard Lee Moore (born January 14, 1971) is an American former teacher and politician. He was elected twice to the North Carolina House of Representatives, where he chaired the Committee on Aging and Education Subcommittee on Pre-School, Elementary and Secondary Education, before resigning in 2000 following his indictment on sex crime charges.

Moore succeeded Robin Hayes, who was the Republican nominee for Governor in 1996, and he won reelection two years later. He voluntarily resigned his position at A.L. Brown High School and surrendered his teaching license following an abuse claim against him involving a 16-year old former student. Leonard B. Sossamon Jr. was appointed to succeed Moore when he resigned from the House months later.

References

External links
Profile at Vote Smart

1971 births
Living people
Duke University alumni
People from Kannapolis, North Carolina
Democratic Party members of the North Carolina House of Representatives
North Carolina politicians convicted of crimes
American politicians convicted of sex offences
21st-century American politicians
20th-century American politicians